Coke Studio may refer to:

 Coke Studio (Pakistani TV program), a Pakistani television series featuring live music performances
 Coke Studio (Indian TV program), an Indian television series featuring live music performances
 Coke Studio Bangla, a Bangladeshi television series featuring live music performances
 Coke Studio Bel 3arabi, a music television series in the Middle East and North Africa
 Coke Studio Philippines, a Philippines television series featuring live music performances
 Coke Studios, or MyCoke, a defunct online chat game used for marketing the Coca-Cola brand